Petros Manos may refer to:

 Petros Manos (officer) (1871–1918), colonel, father-in-law of King Alexander of Greece
 Petros Manos (fencer) (1871–?), Greek fencer